C.O.R.E. Digital Pictures was a Canadian film and television computer animation special effects studio based in Toronto, and founded at the end of March 1994. Its productions included fully animated television series and feature films. 

C.O.R.E. signed a production partnership deal with Radar Pictures.

History
C.O.R.E. Digital Pictures was started in 1994 by John Mariella, Kyle Menzies, Bob Munroe and William Shatner.

Its first and only animated feature film, The Wild, was distributed by Walt Disney Pictures. It met with unfavourable critical and commercial reaction. With 400 temporary employees.

As with most Canadian F/X firms, a rising exchange rate, coupled with a decline in employment due to the economic downturn, would take a negative toll on C.O.R.E. After failing to secure a loan guarantee from the provincial government of Ontario, C.O.R.E. ceased operations on March 15, 2010.

C.O.R.E. Digital Pictures
 Killshot (Weinstein Co./Film Colony/A Band Apart/Lawrence Bender Prods.)
 Beverly Hills Chihuahua (Walt Disney Pictures)
 Firehouse Dog (New Regency Prods./Twentieth Century Fox)
 Silent Hill Davis Films / Wander Star / TriStar / Columbia)
 Lucky Number Slevin Ascendant Pictures / Weinstein Co.)
 Saw 2 (Evolution Entertainment / Twisted Pictures
 Hotel for Dogs (DreamWorks Pictures / Nickelodeon Movies)
 Resident Evil: Apocalypse (Screen Gems Studio/Davis Films/Impact)
 Siblings (Canadian Film Centre)
 Duma (Warner Bros.)
 Harold & Kumar Go to White Castle (Senator Films/New Line Cinema)
 New York Minute (Warner Bros.)
 My Baby's Daddy (Miramax Films)
 Malibu's Most Wanted (Warner Bros.)
 Nothing (49th Parallel)
 Against the Ropes (Cort-Madden Productions/Paramount Pictures)
 They (Radar Pictures)
 Cypher (Pandora/Miramax Films)
 Blade II (New Line Cinema)
 The Time Machine (DreamWorks Pictures / Warner Bros. Pictures)
 S1M0NE (New Line Cinema)
 Who Is Cletis Tout? (Fireworks / Paramount Classics)
 Glitter (Columbia Pictures)
 Caveman's Velentine (Franchise Pictures / Jersey Films / Universal Studios)
 Finding Forrester (Columbia Pictures)
 Nutty Professor II: The Klumps (Universal Pictures)
 X-Men (Marvel Entertainment Group/Twentieth Century Fox)
 Thomas and the Magic Railroad (Gullane Pictures / Destination Films)
 Knockaround Guys (New Line Cinema)
 Snow Day (Paramount Pictures / Nickelodeon Movies)
 A Walk on the Moon (Punch Productions / Miramax Films)
 Dr. Dolittle (Twentieth Century Fox)
 The Big Hit (Columbia/Tri-Star Pictures)
 The Mighty (Alliance/Miramax)
 Flubber (Disney)
 Mimic (Dimension Films/Miramax)
 Spawn (New Line Cinema)
 Cube (Canadian Film Centre)
 Fly Away Home (Columbia Pictures)
 Johnny Mnemonic (Tristar Pictures)
 The Spine (National Film Board of Canada)

Television
Series, unless mentioned otherwise.

 Planet Sheen Nickelodeon Animation Studio/Omation Animation Studio (now produced by Bardel Entertainment) (O Entertainment)
 The Tudors
 National Aboriginal Achievement Awards National Aboriginal Achievement Foundation
 Code Breakers - MOW Orly Adelson Productions/ESPN Original Entertainment
 Kevin Hill Kevin Hill Prods. Inc./ABC, Inc.
 Anonymous Rex - Pilot Fox Television/ Sci-Fi
 Wonderfalls - Pilot and Series, Fox Television
 Dead Aviators – MOW Temple Street/Showtime/CBC
 The Music Man - MOW The Disney Channel
 Spinning Boris - MOW Dufferin Gate Productions/ Showtime
 Salem Witch Trials - MOW Alliance Atlantis Communications/Spring Creek Productions
 Tru Confessions (The Disney Channel, MOW)
 The Zack Files (Decode Entertainment for Fox Family/Channel 4)
 The Rats (Cort-Madden Productions/Fox Television, MOW)
 Prancer Returns (USA Studios, MOW)
 The Feast of All Saints (Dufferin Gate/Showtime, miniseries)
 Jett Jackson: The Movie (Alliance/Atlantis & The Disney Channel, MOW)
 The Four Seasons (MOW)
 Don Giovanni: Leporello's Revenge (Rhombus Media/CBC, MOW)
 Model Behavior (Disney Telefilms/The Wonderful World of Disney, MOW)
 PSI Factor (Atlantis/Alliance/CTV, Seasons I, II, III & IV)
 Sandy Bottom Orchestra (Dufferin Gate Productions/Showtime, MOW)
 Dead Aviators (Temple Street/Showtime/CBC, MOW)
 Sea People (Temple Street/Showtime, MOW)
 John Woo's Once a Thief (Alliance Communications)
 LEXX (TiMe Film/Salter Street Films)
 Shock Treatment (Alliance/CBS, pilot)
 Government of Playhouse (cancelled pitch pilot)
 Tek War (Atlantis Films)

Games
 Midnight Club 3 (Rock Star Games, intro sequence)

C.O.R.E. Toons
 Dudson (Decode Entertainment)
 Dragon Tales (CBC/Sesame Workshop/Sony Pictures Television/Decode Entertainment/PBS)
 Miss Spider's Sunny Patch Friends ( Nelvana/AbsoluteDigital Pictures/Callaway Arts)
 Prehistonic Planet (Taffy Entertainment/Mike Young Productions/Sixteen South/HIT Entertainment/Blueprint Entertainment/DQ Entertainment/Telegael Teoranta/TG4/Star Utsav/CBC Television/CBeebies/Discovery Kids)
 The Naughty Naughty Pets (Decode Entertainment/CBC)
 The Save-Ums! (Decode Entertainment/Discovery Kids/CBC/The Dan Clark Company)
 Franny's Feet (Decode Entertainment/Family Channel/PBS)
 Adventures from the Book of Virtues (PorchLight/FOX/Kristin/PBS)
 The Hoobs (Decode Entertainment/Jim Henson Productions/Sesame Workshop/Hit Entertainment/PBS Kids Sprout Originals)
 Angela Anaconda (Decode/Fox Family/Teletoon)
 Yam Roll (CBC/Decode Entertainment/Spectra Animation)
 Brats of the Lost Nebula (Decode Entertainment/Jim Henson Productions/Kids' WB)
 Iggy Arbuckle (Blueprint Entertainment/National Geographic Kids/Teletoon)
 Planet Sketch (Decode Entertainment/Aardman Animations/Teletoon)
 Planet Sheen (Nickelodeon/Omation/Cookie Jar Entertainment)
 Chop Socky Chooks (Decode Entertainment/Aardman Animations/Cartoon Network Studios)
 Paws & Tales (Providential Pictures)
 Urban Vermin (Decode Entertainment)
 Super Why! (Decode Entertainment/Out Of The Blue Enterprises/PBS)

Animated films

 The Wild (C.O.R.E. / Walt Disney Pictures) (production company)

References

External links

Canadian animation studios
Companies based in Toronto
Mass media companies established in 1994
Mass media companies disestablished in 2010
Defunct film and television production companies of Canada
Digital media
1994 establishments in Ontario
2010 disestablishments in Ontario